"Kwaku the Traveller" is a song by Ghanaian drill musician Black Sherif. It was released on 31 March 2022, through Blacko, and Empire. "Kwaku the Traveller" was written by Black Sherif, and produced by Joker Nharnah. Its debuts at number 1 in Nigeria TurnTable Top 50 chart, number 5 on the Billboard U.S. Afrobeats Songs Chart and number 2 on the UK Afrobeats Singles Chart. On 11 July 2022, following the launch of TurnTable Top 100, an expansion of the Top 50 chart, "Kwaku the Traveller" debut at number 22. On 14 July 2022, "Kwaku the Traveller" debut at number 2 on the newly launched Nigeria Top Hip-Hop/Rap Songs chart.

Composition
Reviewing for The FADER, David Renshaw wrote, "Kwaku The Traveller" finds Sherif in full grind mode but able to acknowledge the bumps in the road he encounters on his way to making the money in his sights. As he puts it in his distinctive vocals: "Of course I fucked up. Who never fuck up hands in the air, no hands? I was young what you expect from me? It is what it is".

Commercial performance
"Kwaku the Traveller" debuted at number 1 in Nigeria TurnTable Top 50 chart, number 5 on the Billboard U.S. Afrobeats Songs and number 2 on the UK Afrobeats Singles Chart. On 19 April, it debuted at number 12 on Billboard Top Triller Global. On 3 April 2022, it became the first Ghana record to top the Nigeria Apple Music Top 100, at number one, and Nigeria Turntable charts on 11 April 2022. "Kwaku the Traveller" became the most streamed song in Spotify Nigeria Charts, on 12 April 2022. "Kwaku the Traveller" is Black Sherif's second most popular record with over 2.5 million Spotify streams, and his most popular record with over 14.6 million Boomplay streams as of 20 April 2022.

Accolades

Charts

Weekly charts

Year-end charts

Release history

References 

2022 singles
2022 songs
Empire Distribution singles
Drill songs